Qingyuan, also called QYEV, is a Chinese automobile manufacturer headquartered in Tianjin, China,  that specializes in producing electric vehicles.

History
Qingyuan was founded in 2001, and is based in Tianjian. It was the first Chinese automotive brand to export vehicles. They built their first production line factory in 2008. In 2006, they created the world's first electric vehicle crash test. They have a total of 100 city service centers and 200 dealerships in Tianjin, Hebei, Shandong, Henan, Jiangsu, Hubei, Hunan, Shanxi, and Chongqing. They have exported vehicles to other Asian countries and Britain.

Qingyuan's first car was the Bende in 2001. It is a rebadged licensed production of the Chrysler Neon LS. Its second vehicle was the Qingyuan S60 created in 2005, essentially a rebadged Miles ZS40S. They attempted to produce more vehicles with licensed rebadges of Hafei models from 2006 to 2014, all of which unsuccessful. They made the B6 based on the Hafei Saibao), T5 (also a rebadged Hafei), and the A0 (rebadged Miles Electric Vehicles product). The Qingyuan Y01A SUV went in production from 2018 to 2019.

They have also attempted to create many self-driving vehicles, including a minibus, tour bus, shuttle bus, sterilizing vehicle, distribution vehicle, and street sweeper.

The company's first successful vehicle was the Xiaozun. It is a small hatchback, and was shown at the 2019 Auto Shanghai. It uses a lithium-ion battery and has a range of 400 km. It includes driver-assist features such as low-speed pedestrian warning, driver fatigue warning, and a TMPS tire pressure detection system. Its dimensions are 3400 mm/1695 mm/1560 mm, and a wheelbase of 2250 mm.

The Qingyuan Zun was introduced at the 2019 Shanghai Auto Show, as a concept vehicle. The Zun is also called the Qingyuan Zunzhe. It has a Level 4 self driving system. The car has a wheelbase of 3500 mm, and dimensions measuring 5500 mm/2150 mm/1650 mm.

The W01 is a compact self-driving hatchback. It has no steering wheel, pedals, and shifting. It has an autonomous level of L4.

Vehicles

Current models
Qingyaun currently has 1 production vehicles.

Concept Vehicles

Commercial Use

Private Use

Van
Qingyuan QY5030XXYBEVYL
Qingyuan QY5022XXYBEVYL
Qingyuan QY5020XXYBEVYL
Qingyuan QY5020XXYBEVEL
Qingyuan QY5021XXYBEVYL
Qingyuan QY5021XXYBEVYC
Qingyuan QY5020XXYBEVYC
Qingyuan QY5020XFWBEVEL
Qingyuan QY5020XFWBEVEC
Qingyuan QY5020XYZBEVEL
Qingyuan QY5020XYZBEVEC
Qingyuan QY5021XYZBEVEL

Garbage Truck
Qingyuan QY5020ZLJBEVYL
Qingyuan QY5021ZLJBEVYL
Qingyuan QY5021ZLJBEVYC
Qingyuan QY5020ZLJBEVYC
Qingyuan QY5030ZZZBEVYL
Qingyuan QY5022ZLJBEVYL

Maintenance Truck
Qingyuan QY5031TYHBEVYL
Qingyuan QY5030TYHBEVYL
Qingyuan QY5030TSLBEVYL
Qingyuan QY5020JGK
Qingyuan QY5020GKC-08BEVA

See also
 Techrules
 Levdeo
 Aoxin

References

Car brands
Car manufacturers of China
Chinese brands